Flor Procuna Chamorro (born 20 May 1952) is a Mexican actress, best known as the villainous Irma Ramos in the telenovela Los ricos también lloran.

She is the daughter of Mexican bullfighter Luis Procuna and Consuelo Chamorro Benard and the aunt of Alejandra Procuna. Her maternal grandmother, Agustina (Tina) Benard de Chamorro, was a well known personality who acted in several plays in her country, Nicaragua.

Selected filmography
Los inconformes (1968)
Los caudillos (1968)
Águeda (1968)
Extraño en su pueblo (1973)
Rosario de amor (1978)
Los ricos también lloran (1979)
Vanessa (1982)
Rosa salvaje (1988)
Velo de novia (2003)
Duelo de pasiones (2006)
Tormenta en el paraíso (2007)

References

External links

1952 births
Mexican stage actresses
Mexican television actresses
Mexican film actresses
Mexican people of Nicaraguan descent
Living people